Medenitsyno is a rural locality (a village) in Samotovinskoye Rural Settlement, Velikoustyugsky District, Vologda Oblast, Russia. The population was 28 as of 2002. There are 2 streets.

Geography 
Medenitsyno is located 5 km west of Veliky Ustyug (the district's administrative centre) by road. Zherebyatyevo is the nearest rural locality.

References 

Rural localities in Velikoustyugsky District